Buffalo is an unincorporated community in Henderson County, located in the U.S. state of Texas. It was the county seat from 1846 to 1848.

References

Unincorporated communities in Henderson County, Texas
Unincorporated communities in Texas